The Indian Journal of Psychological Medicine is a peer-reviewed open access medical journal published by SAGE Publications on behalf of the Indian Psychiatric Society, South Zonal Branch. It covers all aspects of psychiatry and was established in 1978.

Abstracting and indexing 
The journal is abstracted and indexed in:

External links 
 

Open access journals
English-language journals
Publications established in 1979
Biannual journals
Psychiatry journals
Medknow Publications academic journals
Academic journals associated with learned and professional societies of India
Clinical psychology journals